Shiina or Shīna (written: 椎名) is a Japanese surname. Notable people with the surname include:

, Japanese manga artist
, Japanese figure skater
, Japanese model and actress
, Japanese politician
, Japanese voice actress and singer
, Japanese anime and video game composer
, Japanese chemist
, Japanese singer-songwriter
, Japanese manga artist
Katsutoshi Shiina (born 1961), Japanese karateka
, Japanese footballer
, Japanese politician
Kensuke Shiina, Japanese DJ and musician
, Japanese actor
Mai Shiina, Japanese karateka
, Japanese voice actress and singer
, Japanese footballer
, Japanese actress and singer
, Japanese singer-songwriter
, Japanese writer and playwright
, Japanese manga artist
, Japanese daimyō
, Japanese illustrator and manga artist
, Japanese jazz pianist and composer

Fictional characters

Surname
Miyako Shiina of Maji de Watashi ni Koi Shinasai!
Sakurako Shiina of Negima!
Mayuri Shiina of Steins;Gate
Mashiro Shiina of Sakurasou no Pet na Kanojo
Shiina of Angel Beats!
Yousuke Shiina of Ninpuu Sentai Hurricaneger

Given name
Sheena Fujibayashi, a character in the video game Tales of Symphonia
 a character in the manga series Shadow Star
 Shiina "Misha" Mikado, a character in the visual novel Katawa Shoujo

Japanese-language surnames